Sarıpınar can refer to:

 Sarıpınar, İliç
 Sarıpınar, İvrindi